The 1955 season was the Hawthorn Football Club's 31st season in the Victorian Football League and 54th overall.

Fixture

Premiership Season

Ladder

References

Hawthorn Football Club seasons